The Military Order of the Stars and Bars (MOSB) is a 501(c)(3) charitable organization in the United States based in Woodbridge, Virginia. It is a lineage society founded in 1938 for men who are descended from military officers or political leaders in the Confederate States of America (CSA).

History
The order was founded in 1938 in Columbia, South Carolina, at a meeting attended by 17 former Confederate officers and 47 male descendants of Confederate officers. They voted to begin a new CSA veterans society, with a commitment to hold annual meetings, and chose the name of the "Order of the Stars & Bars".

The organization changed its name to "The Military Order of the Stars & Bars" at the 39th General Convention held in Memphis, Tennessee in 1976. It adopted the Confederate battle flag as the official insignia of the order.

Organization and activities
The group's handbook defines it as a non-political educational, historical, patriotic, and heritage group. The executive director is called the "Commander General of the Military Order of the Stars and Bars". The current executive director (as of 2022) is Jon E. Trent. The organization awards scholarships and literary awards for books about Confederate history.

At the initiation of new members, and at the beginning of meetings, members pledge to "commemorate and honor the service of leadership these men rendered in the cause of the fundamental American principles of self-determination and States' Rights and to perpetuate the 
true history of their deeds for the edification of ourselves, our society, and for generations yet unborn" and salute the Confederate flag "with affection, reverence and undying devotion for the Cause for which it stands".

See also 

Military Order of the Loyal Legion of the United States
Sons of Confederate Veterans
United Confederate Veterans

References

External links
Official website

501(c)(3) organizations
1938 establishments in South Carolina
Aftermath of the American Civil War
American Civil War veterans and descendants organizations
Fraternal orders
Lineage societies
Men's organizations in the United States
Nonpartisan organizations in the United States
Non-profit organizations based in North Carolina
Organizations established in 1938
Patriotic societies